Nersessian or Nercessian is an Armenian surname. It may refer to:
 Anahid Nersessian (born 1982), American writer
 Jacky Nercessian (born 1950), French actor 
 Nancy J. Nersessian, cognitive scientist 
 Pavel Nersessian (born 1964), Russian pianist
 Sirarpie Der Nersessian (1896–1989), Armenian art historian 
 Stepan Nercessian (born 1953), Brazilian actor and politician
 Vrej Nersessian (born 1948), curator at the British Library

See also 
 Nersisyan

Armenian-language surnames